Acacia ixiophylla, also known as sticky leaved wattle, is a shrub of the genus Acacia and the subgenus Plurinerves that is endemic to coastal parts of eastern Australia.

Description
It has hairy often viscid branchlets. Like most species of Acacia it has phyllodes rather than true leaves.

Taxonomy
The species was first formally described by the botanist George Bentham in 1842 as part of the William Jackson Hooker work Notes on Mimoseae, with a synopsis of species as published in the London Journal of Botany. It was reclassified as Racosperma ixiophyllum by Leslie Pedley in 1987 then transferred back to genus Acacia in 2001. The only other synonyms are; Acacia fuliginea and Acacia venulosa var. lanata.
The specific epithet is in reference to the sticky or viscid nature of the phyllodes. A. ixiophylla closely resembles Acacia montana.

Distribution
The bulk of the population is found along the western plains and slopes down the Great Dividing Range from near Mount Wilson in New South Wales in the south to around Miles in Queensland in the north. Other smaller populations are found even further north around Jericho and Alpha where it grows in gravelly and sandy soils as a part of woodland containing species of Casuarina, Eucalyptus and Callitris.

See also
 List of Acacia species

References

abrupta
Flora of New South Wales
Flora of Queensland
Taxa named by George Bentham
Plants described in 1842